When Bearcat Went Dry is a 1919 American silent drama film directed by Oliver L. Sellers from the novel by Charles Neville Buck, and starring Lon Chaney as Kindard Powers. The title refers to a character nicknamed "Bearcat" (Bernard J. Durning) who promises his girlfriend that he will quit drinking liquor. The plot involving a promise to give up drinking was timely given the passage of the Wartime Prohibition Act, which took effect on June 30, 1919, and banned the sale of alcoholic beverages, and ratification of the Eighteenth Amendment to the United States Constitution in January of the same year.

Portions of the film were shot on location in Marlin, Kentucky. It was considered to be a lost film until a print was donated to the American Film Institute from the private collection of projectionist Bill Buffum in 1996. (Another print with Dutch intertitles is said to be stored at the Netherlands Film Museum in Amsterdam (missing a few titles in the first reel).) Oddly enough, legendary silent film collector John Hampton also claimed to once own a nitrate print that was destroyed when his basement flooded. The film was re-issued on 4/20/28, and it may be that these later release prints are the ones that survived.

Plot
Turner Stacy is a wild young moonshiner known as "Bearcat" living in the Cumberland Mountains of Kentucky. Bearcat falls head over heels for  Blossom Fulkerson, a minister's daughter, whom he promises he will give up drinking. Bearcat's father gets arrested by revenue agents for running an illegal still and is sent to jail. Bearcat flees to Virginia for awhile to avoid having to testify against his father. When Bearcat returns home, he finds Blossom is engaged to Jerry Henderson, a young man who works for the railroad, and Bearcat develops an instant hatred for him.

A group of mountain men led by the brutish Kindard Powers (Lon Chaney) attacks Jerry Henderson, mistaking him for a revenue officer. Henderson escapes them by hiding overnight in Blossom's house, which compromises the young lady's reputation in the town. Henderson is rescued by Bearcat after Powers and his men attack him a second time, but this time Henderson is fatally injured.

Bearcat forces Henderson to marry Blossom from his death bed in order to preserve her honor, but Henderson dies soon after the ceremony. Now Bearcat wants to get rid of Kindard Powers once and for all. After Bearcat's father is released from prison, Bearcat attacks and kills Powers in a fight, and the criminal gang disbands. Blossom talks of leaving town to become a schoolteacher, but she changes her mind and marries Bearcat in the end.

Cast
 Bernard J. Durning as Turner "Bearcat" Stacy
 Lon Chaney as Kindard Powers
 Vangie Valentine as Blossom Fulkerson
 Millard K. Wilson as Jerry Henderson (credited as M. K. Wilson)
 Winter Hall as Lone Stacy (Bearcat's father)
 Walt Whitman as Joel Fulkerson (Blossom's father)
 Ed Brady as Rattler Webb

Reception
"The picture cost $71,642.17 to make, and even the 17 cents shows on the screen." ---Wid's Daily

"Apart from the smashing exploitation possibilities on the title of this picture the production affords most excellent entertainment...This is a well directed picture interpreted by a cast of very good types. Suspense and fast action with love and pathos are combined and it will undoubtedly register heavily with the majority and completely satisfy the minority also." --- Motion Picture News.

"The production is replete with the atmosphere of the southern mountains, and presents interesting types of men...impersonated by a competent cast. ---Moving Picture World

"Besides being remarkably well directed, produced and acted, this is a picture with a big red-blooded theme...Walt Whitman, Ed Brady and Lon Chaney portray difficult character parts with remarkable art. ---Exhibitors Trade Review

References

External links

1919 films
1919 drama films
Silent American drama films
American black-and-white films
World Film Company films
1910s rediscovered films
American silent feature films
Films based on American novels
Films directed by Oliver L. Sellers
Rediscovered American films
1910s American films
1910s English-language films